Edgar John Dunbar (12 April 1902 – 5 July 1985) was a former Australian rules footballer who played with Melbourne in the Victorian Football League (VFL).

Notes

External links 

1902 births
Australian rules footballers from Victoria (Australia)
Melbourne Football Club players
1985 deaths
People from Traralgon